Mozal is an aluminium smelter joint project in Beluluane Industrial Park, Maputo, Mozambique. The project is a smelting facility that began operations as a producer of aluminium exclusively for export.

Mozal was a joint venture between BHP Billiton (47.1 percent), Mitsubishi Corporation (25 percent), Industrial Development Corp. of South Africa (24 percent), and the Government of Mozambique (3.9 percent).

The project began life in 1998 as part of a recovery programme led by the Mozambican government’s active desire for foreign investment to help rebuild the nation after the country’s civil war in the early 1990s.
The Mozal smelter was officially opened in September 2000. It was the first major foreign investment in Mozambique and is the biggest private-sector project in the country.

Originally commissioned as a 250 ktpa (250,000 ton per annum) smelter, Mozal was followed by an extension (Mozal II) in 2003-04, and it is now the largest aluminium producer in Mozambique and the second-largest in Africa having a total annual production of around 580,000 tons. It is responsible for 30 percent of the country’s official exports and also uses 45 percent of the electricity produced in Mozambique.

In February 2013, Mozal signed an agreement under which it will supply 50,000 tonnes of aluminium to Midal, one of the world’s largest manufacturers of aluminium cables. Midal is to set up a factory in Mozambique and use aluminium ingots produced at the Mozal smelter as its raw material. This is the first time that aluminium produced by Mozal will be used in Mozambique, as up until this agreement, Mozal exclusively exported its aluminium. 

BHP Billiton holdings were demerged into South32. South32 currently owns 63.7%, Mitsubishi Corporation (through MCA Metals Holding GmbH), the Industrial Development Corporation of South Africa Limited and the Government of the Republic of Mozambique share the remaining ownership interest.

References

External links
South32 Mozal Home page

Aluminium companies of Mozambique
Aluminium smelters
BHP
Companies based in Maputo
Mitsubishi companies